

F meson 
 Outdated name for the strange D meson.

f and f' mesons 
 Term for scalar mesons with JPC 0++ consisting of light quarks.